Lone Tree Creek, formerly Dry Creek, a stream and tributary to the San Joaquin River, flowing in San Joaquin County and Stanislaus County, central California.

It is named for the settlement of Lone Tree, about 2 1/4 miles northeast of present day Escalon.

Its headwaters, in the Sierra Nevada foothills, are now 3.4 miles northwest of Oakdale, about 550 ft. southwest of the end of Parson Ranch Road, in Stanislaus County.  Originally its source in the foothills was a few miles to the east, but its upper reaches were subsequently diverted for irrigation.

The creek flows westward into San Joaquin County where it joins with Little John Creek.  Their confluence forms French Camp Slough, a  primary tributary of the San Joaquin River.

History
The settlement of Lone Tree was once the location of a crossing on Dry Creek, for the Stockton - Los Angeles Road on its route from Stockton to the ferries on the Stanislaus River in the vicinity of Oakdale.

References

External links
  Official map of the State of California, 1854 From 1853, showing settlement of Lone Tree and Dry Creek (as a tributary of the Stanislaus River, unlike today). From David Rumsey Historical Map Collection, www.davidrumsey.com.
  Britton & Rey's Map Of The State Of California, 1857 showing settlement of Lone Tree and the creek is now nameless, and no longer a tributary of the Stanislaus River). From David Rumsey Historical Map Collection, www.davidrumsey.com.

Rivers of San Joaquin County, California
Rivers of Stanislaus County, California
Tributaries of the San Joaquin River
Rivers of the Sierra Nevada (United States)
Geography of the San Joaquin Valley
Rivers of Northern California
Rivers of the Sierra Nevada in California